Filip Westerlund (born 17 April 1999) is a Swedish professional ice hockey defenceman. He is currently playing for Ilves of the Finnish Liiga on loan from HV71 of the Swedish Hockey League (SHL). Westerlund was drafted by the Arizona Coyotes in the second round, 44th overall, of the 2017 NHL Entry Draft.

Playing career
Westerlund first played as a youth with hometown club, AIK Härnösand until the J18 Elit level. In his second season within the Frölunda HC organization, Westerlund made his SHL debut in the 2016–17 campaign, featuring in 33 games from the blueline for 4 assists.

During the final year of his contract with Frölunda in the 2018–19 season, Westerlund registered 2 points in 19 games before he was loaned for the remainder of the year to fellow SHL club, Timrå IK, on January 23, 2019. Westerlund notched two goals in 4 games before his season was ended through injury, unable to help Timrå avoid relegation to the Allsvenskan.

Out of contract with Frölunda, Westerlund opted to continue with Timrå IK in the HockeyAllsvenskan, securing a one-year deal on 19 August 2019.

After four seasons with Timrå IK, Westerlund left the club at the conclusion of his contract, joining newly promoted HV71 by agreeing to a two year contract on 17 May 2022.

Career statistics

Regular season and playoffs

International

Awards and honors

References

External links

1999 births
Living people
Arizona Coyotes draft picks
IF Björklöven players
Frölunda HC players
HV71 players
Ilves players
Swedish ice hockey defencemen
Timrå IK players
People from Härnösand
Sportspeople from Västernorrland County